Barakat! ("Blessings!") is a 2006 French/Algerian drama film directed by Djamila Sahraoui. It premiered at the Berlin International Film Festival on 16 February 2006.

Plot
During the Algerian Civil War, Amel (Rachida Brakni) is a doctor who, on returning home from work one day, discovers that her journalist husband has gone missing. Receiving no help from the authorities, she decides to look for him herself. She is helped by another woman, Khadidja.

Cast
Rachida Brakni as Amel
Fattouma Ousliha Bouamari as Khadidja
Zahir Bouzerar as Le vieil homme
Malika Belbey as Nadia
Amine Kedam as Bilal
Ahmed Berrhama as Karim
Abdelbacet Benkhalifa as L'homme du barrage
Abdelkrim Beriber as Le policier
Ahmed Benaissa as Homme accueil hôpital
Mohamed Bouamari as Hadj Slimane

Awards
At the 2007 Panafrican Film and Television Festival of Ouagadougou, Barakat! won the Oumarou Ganda Award for the Best First Work, the award for Best Music and the award for Best Screenplay. It also won the prize for Best Arab Film at the third Dubai International Film Festival.

References

External links

 

2006 films
2000s Arabic-language films
2006 drama films
2000s French-language films
Algerian drama films
French drama films
2006 multilingual films
Algerian multilingual films
French multilingual films
2000s French films